Liparis montagui, or Montagu's seasnail, is a marine fish of the seasnail family (Liparidae). It inhabits the northeastern Atlantic, mainly around the British Isles, the North Sea, the Norwegian Sea, southern Iceland and as far north as the Barents Sea. It is a small (maximum 12 cm), demersal fish, usually living between from the intertidal zone to 30 metres deep, where it hides under stones or algae. It mainly feeds on small invertebrates, such as small crabs, shrimp and amphipods.

References
Fishbase.org

montagui
Fish of the Atlantic Ocean
Fish of the Arctic Ocean
Fish of the North Sea
Fish of Europe
Fish described in 1804